Cheongju Yang clan is one of the Korean clans. Their Bon-gwan is in Cheongju, North Chungcheong Province. According to the research held in 2015, the number of Cheongju Yang clan’s member was 38161. When Yang Gi was a Jinzi Guanglu Daifu, Queen Noguk had a marriage to an ordinary person planned by Gongmin of Goryeo. Because of this, Yang Gi entered Goryeo as a fatherly master of Queen Noguk. Yang Gi became Gongsin because he made a lot of contribution to diplomacy in Goryeo and Yuan dynasty. Yang Gi’s descendant founded Cheongju Yang clan and made Cheongju, Cheongju Yang clan’s Bon-gwan.

See also 
 Korean clan names of foreign origin

References

External links 
 

 
Yang clans
Korean clan names of Chinese origin